Gee is the nickname of:

 Gee Abanilla (born 1966), Filipino basketball former player, coach and manager
 Gee Atherton (born 1985), English racing cyclist
 Gee Mitchell (1912–1984), American college football and boxing coach
 Gee Walker (1908–1981), American Major League Baseball player
 Gerard Way (born 1977), American singer, songwriter, and comic book writer, lead singer of rock band My Chemical Romance

Lists of people by nickname